Ellen Marie Vars  (born 12 August 1957) is a Norwegian Sami writer. She was born in Láhpoluoppal, Kautokeino. She made her literary debut in 1986 with the youth novel Kátjá , which came to be among the most read Sami books in Norway. Her novel Čábbámus iđitguovssu earned her the Saami Council Literature Prize in 2005. Čábbámus iđitguovssu has been translated into English as The most beautiful dawn, and illustrated by Trygve Lund Guttormsen.

References

1957 births
Living people
People from Kautokeino
Norwegian women novelists
20th-century Norwegian novelists
21st-century Norwegian novelists
Norwegian Sámi-language writers
21st-century Norwegian women writers
20th-century Norwegian women writers